The NHL All-Rookie Team is chosen by the Professional Hockey Writers' Association from the best rookies in the National Hockey League at each position for the season just concluded based on their performance in that year. The team was first named after the 1982–83 NHL season and since then many future stars have been selected.

The team consists of one goalie, two defensemen and three forwards. In order to be considered a rookie in the NHL, the rookie must be eligible to win the Calder Memorial Trophy. The qualification criteria to be eligible are that the player must not have played in more than 25 NHL games in any previous year nor played in six or more NHL games in each of any two preceding seasons, as well as being under the age of 26 on September 15 of the season in which he is eligible.  The age consideration was added after Sergei Makarov won the trophy at age 31 in 1990.

The only player to be awarded the Calder Trophy without being named to the All-Rookie Team is Pavel Bure (in 1991–92), because he received votes at both right wing and left wing, but not enough to lead at either position.  Since that time, the rules have been changed so that all forwards are voted on together. Jamie Storr and Jake Allen are the only players to be named to the All-Rookie Team more than once, both having done so twice in 1997–98 and 1998–99 (Storr) and 2012–13 and 2014–15 (Allen).

Selections

Accomplishments
Team with most players (one year): 1986–87 Los Angeles Kings: Jimmy Carson, Steve Duchesne, Luc Robitaille
Team with most players (all-time): 13; Chicago Blackhawks, Montreal Canadiens, New Jersey Devils
Team with fewest players (all-time): 0; Seattle Kraken, Vegas Golden Knights
Players with most nominations (all-time): 2; Jamie Storr (1997–98 and 1998–99) and Jake Allen (2012–13 and 2014–15)
Stanley Cup winner as member of the All-Rookie Team: 
1985–86: Patrick Roy, Kjell Dahlin
1989–90: Geoff Smith
1990–91: Jaromir Jagr
1999–2000: Scott Gomez
2012–13: Brandon Saad
2016–17: Matt Murray
2018–19: Jordan Binnington
Oldest player (all-time): Sergei Makarov; 31 years old, 1989–90

References

Specific

General 
2005 NHL Official Guide & Record Book - 
Total Hockey (Second Edition), Editor - Dan Diamond, 

 

All-Rookie Team
All-Rookie Team
Rookie player awards
Awards established in 1983